Paul Cady Blackburn (born December 4, 1993) is an American professional baseball pitcher for the Oakland Athletics of Major League Baseball (MLB). He made his MLB debut in 2017.

Career

Chicago Cubs
Blackburn was drafted by the Chicago Cubs in the first round of the 2012 Major League Baseball draft out of Heritage High School in Brentwood, California. He made his professional debut that season with the Rookie Arizona League Cubs, going 2–0 with a 3.48 ERA in nine games (six starts). He played in 2013 with the Class A-Short Season Boise Hawks, going 2–3 with a 3.33 ERA in 13 games (12 starts), and in 2014 with the Class A Kane County Cougars, pitching to a 9–4 record with a 3.23 ERA in 24 starts. He spent 2015 with the Class A-Advanced Myrtle Beach Pelicans where he compiled a 7–5 record with a 3.11 ERA and a 1.24 WHIP in 18 starts. Blackburn began 2016 with the Double-A Tennessee Smokies.

Seattle Mariners
On July 20, 2016, the Cubs traded Blackburn and Dan Vogelbach to the Seattle Mariners for Mike Montgomery and Jordan Pries. Seattle assigned him to the Double-A Jackson Generals. In 26 total games (25 starts) between Tennessee and Jackson, he was 9–5 with a 3.27 ERA.

Oakland Athletics
On November 12, 2016, Blackburn was traded to the Oakland Athletics for Danny Valencia. The Athletics added him to their 40-man roster a few days later. He began 2017 with the Triple-A Nashville Sounds. Through June 26, 2017, Blackburn had a 5–6 record with a 3.05 ERA and 56 strikeouts for the Sounds. He was named to the 2017 Pacific Coast League All-Star Team.

Blackburn was called up to the Oakland Athletics to make his major league debut on July 1, 2017, against the Atlanta Braves. He spent the remainder of the season with Oakland, going 3–1 with a 3.22 ERA in ten starts. On August 22, Blackburn was struck on the hand by a line drive off the bat of Trey Mancini during a start in Baltimore. He exited the game and would not pitch again that season.

In 2018, he began the season on the disabled list. He was activated on June 7 and reported to Oakland, compiling a 7.16 ERA in six starts. On August 28, Blackburn was placed on the disabled list with a forearm injury.

In 2019, Blackburn appeared in 4 games, pitching to a 10.64 ERA with 8 strikeouts in 11.0 innings pitched. Blackburn only made one appearance in 2020, giving up 7 earned runs in 2.1 innings pitched.

On February 23, 2021, Blackburn was designated for assignment after the signing of Mitch Moreland was made official. On February 27, Blackburn was outrighted and invited to Spring Training as a non-roster invitee. On August 18, Blackburn was selected from Triple-A Las Vegas.

In 2022, Blackburn's record with Oakland was 7–6 with a 4.28 ERA in 21 starts. Blackburn was Oakland's lone representative for the 2022 All-Star Game.

On January 13, 2023, Blackburn signed a one-year, $1.9 million contract with the Athletics, avoiding salary arbitration.

References

External links

1993 births
Living people
People from Antioch, California
Baseball players from California
Major League Baseball pitchers
American League All-Stars
Oakland Athletics players
Arizona League Cubs players
Boise Hawks players
Kane County Cougars players
Myrtle Beach Pelicans players
Tennessee Smokies players
Jackson Generals (Southern League) players
Nashville Sounds players
Stockton Ports players
Las Vegas Aviators players